John Burnet (March 1781 or 20 March 1784 – 29 April 1868) was a Scottish engraver and painter.

Life
Son of the Surveyor-General of Excise of Scotland, Burnet was born either in Edinburgh in 1781 or in Fisherrow in 1784.  He was apprenticed to the engraver Robert Scott and later trained at the Trustees Academy.

In 1806, he moved from Edinburgh to London, where he became an established painter of portraits, landscapes, and rural genre scenes.

Between 1808 and 1862, he exhibited regularly at the Royal Academy, the British Institution and with the Society of British Artists and was finally awarded a fellowship to the Royal Society.

As an engraver he provided illustrations for editions of Robert Burns’s poems and Walter Scott’s Waverley novels.

He engraved copies of paintings of several notable portraits and artists.

He also wrote manuals and books on drawing, painting and artists, retiring from public life in 1860. He died in London.

Engravings

 1817 line engraving of Thomas Bewick after James Ramsay
 1820 line engraving of Thomas Moore after Sir Martin Archer Shee
 1828 line engraving of Thomas Campbell after Sir Thomas Lawrence
 1839 mixed-method engraving of the Duke of Wellington
 1846 mixed-method engraving of Sir Edwin Landseer's painting 'The Challenge.'

References

External links

National Maritime Museum, images of his paintings
The National Portrait Gallery, images of his engravings

1781 births
1868 deaths
19th-century engravers
19th-century Scottish painters
Scottish male painters
Scottish engravers
Fellows of the Royal Society
Alumni of the Edinburgh College of Art
19th-century Scottish male artists